Hartnell is an English surname. Notable people with this surname include the following:

 Andy Hartnell, American comic book writer
 Bryan Calvin Hartnell, victim of the Zodiac Killer in California, 1969
 John Hartnell, English seaman and explorer on Franklin's lost expedition to find the Northwest Passage
 Sir Norman Hartnell (1901–1979), English fashion designer
 Scott Hartnell (born 1982), Canadian professional ice hockey player
 Tim Hartnell (1951–1991), an Australian journalist
 William Hartnell (1908–1975), English actor who portrayed the First Doctor in the BBC's Doctor Who
 William Edward Petty Hartnell otherwise Don Guillermo Arnel (1798–1854), English-born merchant and administrator in California

Other uses
Hartnell (horse) (foaled 2011), a British racehorse,

See also
 Hartnoll - as a surname
 Hartwell (disambiguation)
 Hartnell College

English-language surnames